Capitão Enéas is a municipality in the north of the Brazilian state of Minas Gerais.  As of 2020 the population was 15,313 in a total area of 970 km2.  

Capitão Enéas belongs to the IBGE statistical microregion of Montes Claros.  The distance to this important regional center is 90 km.  The municipal seat is located on the railway line that links Minas Gerais to Bahia.  

The main economic activity is cattle raising.  In 2006 there were 68,000 head of cattle.  Important agricultural crops are sugarcane, beans, and corn.  There are several small transformation industries.  There was 1 financial institution in 2007.  In 2007 there were 299 automobiles, giving a ratio of 47 inhabitants for each automobile.   

Municipal Human Development Index
MHDI: .667
State ranking: 684 out of 853 municipalities
National ranking: 3,504 out of 5,138 municipalities
Life expectancy: 67
Literacy rate: 73 For the complete list see Frigoletto

See also
List of municipalities in Minas Gerais

References

IBGE

Municipalities in Minas Gerais